Jaynagar Majilpur railway station is a Kolkata Suburban Railway Station on the Main line with an approximate  distance from the Sealdah railway station. It is under the jurisdiction of the Eastern Railway zone of Indian Railways. Jaynagar Majilpur railway station is one of the busiest railway stations in the Sealdah railway division. More than 30 pairs of EMU local trains pass through the railway station on a daily basis. It is situated in South 24 Parganas district in the Indian state of West Bengal. Jaynagar Majilpur railway station serves Jaynagar Majilpur and the surrounding areas.

Geography

History

Electrification

Station complex
The platform is very much well sheltered. The station possesses many facilities including water and sanitation. It is well connected to the SH-1. There is a proper approach road to this station.

References

Railway junction stations in West Bengal
Railway stations in South 24 Parganas district
Sealdah railway division
Kolkata Suburban Railway stations
Railway stations in India opened in 1882
1882 establishments in the British Empire
Transport in Jaynagar Majilpur